Alpena Public Schools is a Michigan school district encompassing all of Alpena County and, in Presque Isle County, all of Presque Isle Township and part of Krakow Township.

Schools

High school (9-12)

Junior high (6-8)

Elementary schools (PreK-5)

Closed elementary schools

See also
List of school districts in Michigan

References

External links
 Official website

Education in Alpena County, Michigan
Education in Presque Isle County, Michigan
School districts in Michigan
School districts established in 1963
1963 establishments in Michigan